Louise Sugden is a British powerlifter and former international wheelchair basketball player.

Wheelchair Basketball
Sugden was born in Newbury.  She started playing wheelchair basketball at age 13.

She competed in 6 European championships, winning bronze in five of them.  She brought home a gold from the 2011 Paralympic World Cup.  She competed in the Beijing and London Paralympic Games.
She retired from international competition in 2016, then from the sport as a whole in 2017.

Powerlifting
In 2017 she started Para powerlifting.  Nine months after starting in the sport, she won a silver medal at the 2018 Commonwealth Games. She was due to compete at the 2022 Commonwealth Games but withdrew due to a shoulder injury.

At the 2020 Paralympic Games, Sugden won powerlifting bronze in the women's 86 kg category, securing the medal with her final lift.
The Newbury lifter successfully made 131 kg in the last round to claim the bronze.

Sugden was a guest on The Last Leg of Tokyo 2020 a few hours after landing in London.

References

British powerlifters
Powerlifters at the 2018 Commonwealth Games
Paralympic powerlifters of Great Britain
Living people
British female weightlifters
Female powerlifters
Commonwealth Games medallists in powerlifting
Commonwealth Games silver medallists for England
1984 births
Powerlifters at the 2020 Summer Paralympics
British women's wheelchair basketball players
Wheelchair basketball players at the 2008 Summer Paralympics
Wheelchair basketball players at the 2012 Summer Paralympics
21st-century British women
Medallists at the 2018 Commonwealth Games